Siobhan Dervan-Horgan (born 22 December 1978) is an Irish former racing cyclist. She is a former Irish National Road Race Champion, a title which she won for four consecutive years from 2005 to 2008. Dervan finished 24th in the 2008 UCI Women's Road Race World Championships, an improvement on her 67th position the previous year. She did not finish the 2009 edition. In January 2011 she joined the Irish team pursuit squad in their bid to qualify for the 2012 Olympic Games. She has competed in a number of triathlons and placed 10th in the European Duathlon Championships in 2014.

Personal life
Siobhan Dervan married John Horgan in January 2009.

Major results
Source: 

2004
 1st  Time trial, National Road Championships
2005
 1st  Road race, National Road Championships
2006
 1st  Road race, National Road Championships
2007
 1st  Road race, National Road Championships
2008
 1st  Road race, National Road Championships
2010
 2nd Road race, National Road Championships
 3rd Classic Féminine Vienne Poitou-Charentes
2011
 1st  Road race, National Road Championships
 Coupe de France Dames
2nd Grand Prix de Plumelec-Morbihan|GP de Plumelec
2nd GP de Nogent l'Abbesse
2012
 National Road Championships
2nd Road race
3rd Time trial
2015
 1st  Time trial, National Road Championships

References

External links

1978 births
Living people
Irish female cyclists